Ricky 6 is a 2000 American-Mexican-Canadian film co-production loosely based on the life of Ricky Kasso, a suburban teenager accused of Satanism and murder in the 1980s. The film was written and directed by Peter Filardi, and based on the 1987 book, "Say You Love Satan" by David St. Clair.  Vincent Kartheiser played the disturbed protagonist, renamed Ricky Cowen, in the film. The movie also stars Chad Christ, Patrick Renna, Sabine Singh and Emmanuelle Chriqui.

The film won the Audience Prize at the Fantasia Film Festival in 2000.  , it has yet to be released in either theaters or on video.  However, bootleg VHS and DVD copies of the film have been sold on various Internet sites. Ricky 6 is an international co-production between the United States, Mexico and Canada and was produced by American producer Terry G. Jones, Mexican producer Juan-Carlos Zapata and Canadian producer William Vince. It was filmed in Fredericton and Woodstock, New Brunswick, Canada.

References

External links

2000 films
American teen films
American teen drama films
American horror films
Mexican horror films
Canadian horror films
2000s crime drama films
Canadian films based on actual events
English-language Canadian films
English-language Mexican films
Films about Satanism
Films scored by Joe Delia
2000 drama films
2000s English-language films
2000s American films
2000s Canadian films
2000s Mexican films